The Spon Lane Locks Branch is an 800-yard section of the BCN Main Line canal in Oldbury, England, which forms a connecting canal "sliproad" where the Old BCN Main Line crosses the New BCN Main Line at the Stewart Aqueduct. It runs westwards from Spon Lane Junction (underneath the M5 motorway) via the three Spon Lane Locks to Bromford Junction. 
It was originally part of the Wednesbury branch of Birmingham Canal which opened in 1769. At the top lock, there is a rare example of a split bridge, which enabled a horse to cross the canal without being detached from the barge. The rope passed through a gap at the centre of the bridge between its two halves. However, this particular example is a modern reconstruction, dating from 1986. These are probably the oldest working locks in the country. There is pedestrian access to a tow path for its entire length, but being narrow and muddy, it is not suitable for cyclists.

This is one of two rivet benchmarks on this branch, the other being at Smethwick Middle Lock.

References

Birmingham Canal Navigations
Canals in the West Midlands (county)
Oldbury, West Midlands
Canals opened in 1769